Masagua is a town, with a population of 16,797 (2018 census), and a municipality in the Escuintla department of Guatemala. In 2008 began construction for a massive power generation plant se property of Jaguar Energy in the municipality.

Jaguar Energy power plant 

Jaguar Energy is a corporation that owns a large coal-based electric generation plant located in Tierra Colorada, Masagua, next to the San Miguel Las Flores community and twenty five km away from Puerto de San José. The company is a subsidiary of the American corporation Ashmore Energy International Ltd.(AEI). It started operations in Guatemala in early 2008 and it plant has an estimated cost of US$750 million, intended to generate 300 MW. The energy produced will be sold to Energuate, the larger power distributor in Guatemala, a subsidiary of the British inversment firm ACTIS.

Climate

Masagua has a tropical savanna climate (Köppen: Aw).

Geographic location

Borders 

Masagua is situated 15 km from Escuintla.  It is one of the municipalities that is enclosed within the Escuintla Department.

See also

 Escuintla Department
 Jaguar Energy

References 

Municipalities of the Escuintla Department